The 1988 Volta a Catalunya was the 68th edition of the Volta a Catalunya cycle race and was held from 2 September to 7 September 1988. The race started in Salou and finished in Lleida. The race was won by Miguel Induráin of the Reynolds team.

General classification

References

1988
Volta
1988 in Spanish road cycling
September 1988 sports events in Europe